State Highway 107 (SH 107) is a state highway in the U.S. state of Texas that runs from Mission to Combes in Deep South Texas.

Route description
SH 107 begins at an intersection with Interstate 2/US Route 83 in Mission and travels north through the center of town. It reaches an intersection with the old routing of US 83 and Texas State Highway 495 in Mission before exiting to the north. It passes through Palmhurst and Alton before turning right on Mile 7 Road.  It then travels east through McAllen into downtown Edinburg, where it intersects the Business Route of US Route 281 and then I-69C/US 281 just to the east.  It continues east through rural farmlands, passing through the towns of Elsa, Edcouch, and La Villa.  The route then turns southeast into Cameron County, passing through Santa Rosa.  The then turn back to the east, reaching the intersection of Business Route 77 and the eastern terminus at I-69E/US 77 in Combes.

History
 SH 107 was designated on March 16, 1925 from Aspermont to Newcastle.
 

Another SH 107 was designated from Santa Anna to the McCulloch county line on July 13, 1925. 

On February 14, 1927, the SH 107 from Aspermont to Newcastle was renumbered as SH 120. As a result, there was only one SH 107 from Santa Anna to the McCulloch county line. On April 13, 1927, SH 107 extended south to Brady. On September 9, 1927, SH 107 was canceled as the route became an extension of SH 4. 

On August 6, 1929, SH 4 was rerouted west, and SH 107 returned on the route from Santa Anna to Brady. On January 19, 1932, SH 107 was canceled, as the route became an extension of SH 16. On May 28, 1932, a new SH 107 was designated from Combes to Edinburg. 

On July 15, 1935, SH 107 was canceled. 

On February 11, 1937, SH 107 was restored. 

It was extended west then south through Mission to Hidalgo on September 26, 1939, absorbing SH 250 and part of SH 48. 

The route has changed little since then, with the stretch from Mission to Hidalgo being transferred to FM 1016 on November 23, 1948. On July 29, 1974, SH 107 was extended south one block over FM 1016 to Conway & 7th Streets. On May 21, 1979, SH 107 was extended from old US 77 to new US 77 and from old US 83 to new US 83.

Major intersections

References

107
Mission, Texas
Transportation in Hidalgo County, Texas
Transportation in Cameron County, Texas